Rimini railway station is the main station serving the city and comune of Rimini, in the region of Emilia-Romagna, northern Italy.  Opened in 1861, it forms part of the Bologna–Ancona railway, and is also a terminus of a secondary railway linking Rimini with Ravenna and Modena.

The station is currently managed by Rete Ferroviaria Italiana (RFI).  However, the commercial area of the passenger building is managed by Centostazioni.  Train services are operated by Trenitalia. Each of these companies is a subsidiary of Ferrovie dello Stato (FS), Italy's state-owned rail company.

Location
Rimini railway station is situated at Piazzale Cesare Battisti, at the northeastern edge of the city centre.

History
The station was constructed by the Società Generalle delle Strade Ferrate Romane, in 1860–1861.  It was opened, in the presence of the then Prince Umberto of Savoy (later Umberto I of Italy), on 4 October 1861, together with the rest of the Forlì–Rimini section of the Bologna–Ancona railway.  Very soon afterwards, on 17 November 1861, Rimini was transformed from a temporary terminal station into a through station, when the final section of that railway, from Rimini to Ancona, came into operation.

The original station building was rather simple in form.  It was located not far from the seaside, on the edge of the city, and was flanked by a locomotive depot and repair workshop.

On 1 July 1865, the whole of the Bologna–Ancona railway, including the station, came under the control of the Società per le Strade Ferrate Meridionali (SFM).  On 10 January 1889, the station became a junction for the newly completed branch line to Ravenna and Ferrara.  This development, coupled with exponential growth in passenger traffic, created the need for an expansion of the station and its facilities, and the construction of other outbuildings.

Soon enough, a further increase in traffic made it essential to move the passenger building to the south of the locomotive depot and workshop, where there was enough space for a new station yard with wider platforms.  The new station building, designed by the architect Ulisse Dini, was opened on 1 November 1914.

Between 1915 and 1917, following the entry of Italy into World War I, the station was bombarded by the Austro-Hungarian Navy.  In 1932, it became a terminus of the short narrow gauge international line to San Marino, which ended at the apron of the station, adjacent to platform 1.  In late 1938, in conjunction with electrification of the line to Ancona, important works were carried out to upgrade the station's facilities.  However, between 1943 and 1944, after the outbreak of World War II, the station and its surrounds were repeatedly hit by allied bombing, in nearly 400 air raids.

In the wake of World War II, damaged buildings were repaired. In 1963, new train control equipment was installed.  In 1978, the station yard was further expanded, to 10 tracks equipped with platforms.  Since the start of the 21st century, some tracks and the locomotive shed have been closed, and the goods yard converted into a car park.

Features

The first station building was built in the classical style of the time.  Its central section was on two levels, and it had two lateral wings, with adjacent service buildings. At that time, there were more than four platforms.

The current passenger building, completed in 1914, was built with pretensions to elegance and functionality, and is now located amongst the historic buildings in the city. At the time of its completion, the number of tracks used for passenger services grew to seven.  In the 1970s, three more platform tracks were added.

Centostazioni has recently been renovating the passenger building with a simultaneous internal reorganization and change of use to the character of a shopping centre.

Train services

The station has more than 5 million passenger movements each year.  Many of the passengers are commuters arriving from and departing for Bologna Centrale, Ravenna and Ancona.  The station is also heavily used by tourists holidaying on the Adriatic coast.

The passenger trains calling at the station include regional trains and a pair of Eurostar trains operating between Rimini and Roma Termini.

The station is served by the following services (incomplete):

High speed services (Frecciarossa) Milan - Bologna - Ancona
High speed services (Italo) Turin - Milan - Bologna - Ancona
High speed services (Frecciarossa) Milan - Bologna - Ancona - Pescara - Foggia – Bari
High speed services (Frecciabianca) Milan - Parma - Bologna - Ancona - Pescara - Foggia - Bari - Brindisi - Lecce
High speed services (Frecciabianca) Milan - Parma - Bologna - Ancona - Pescara - Foggia - Bari - Taranto
High speed services (Frecciabianca) Turin - Parma - Bologna - Ancona - Pescara - Foggia - Bari - Brindisi - Lecce
High speed services (Frecciabianca) Venice - Padua - Bologna - Ancona - Pescara - Foggia - Bari - Brindisi - Lecce
High speed services (Frecciabianca) Ravenna - Rimini - Foligno - Terni - Rome
Intercity services Bologna - Rimini - Ancona - Pescara - Foggia - Bari - Brindisi - Lecce
Intercity services Bologna - Rimini - Ancona - Pescara - Foggia - Bari - Taranto
Night train (Intercity Notte) Milan - Parma - Bolgona - Ancona - Pescara - Foggia - Bari - Brindisi - Lecce
Night train (Intercity Notte) Milan - Ancona - Pescara - Foggia - Bari - Taranto - Brindisi - Lecce
Night train (Intercity Notte) Turin - Alessandria - Bolgona - Ancona - Pescara - Foggia - Bari - Brindisi - Lecce

Interchange
The station provides interchange with local bus routes serving the urban and surrounding areas, including the Rimini–Riccione trolleybus line.

See also

History of rail transport in Italy
List of railway stations in Emilia-Romagna
Rail transport in Italy
Railway stations in Italy

References

External links

Description and pictures of Rimini railway station 

This article is based upon a translation of the Italian language version as at January 2011.

Railway Station
Railway stations in Emilia-Romagna
Railway stations opened in 1861
1861 establishments in Italy
Railway stations in Italy opened in the 19th century